Ariasa is a genus of true bugs belonging to the family Cicadidae.

The species of this genus are found in Southern America.

Species:

Ariasa albimaculosa 
Ariasa albiplica 
Ariasa alboapicata 
Ariasa archavaletae 
Ariasa arechavaletae 
Ariasa bartletti 
Ariasa bilaqueata 
Ariasa colombiae 
Ariasa diupsilon 
Ariasa egregia 
Ariasa maryannae 
Ariasa nigrorufa 
Ariasa nigrovittata 
Ariasa russelli 
Ariasa urens

References

Cicadidae